The following lists events that happened in 2015 in Zimbabwe.

Incumbents
 President: Robert Mugabe 
 First Vice President: Emmerson Mnangagwa
 Second Vice President: Phelekezela Mphoko

Events
9-20 January - 2015 Southeast Africa Floods
 March - A 50 Cents was finally released for the Zimbabwean Bond Coins.
24 September - The Pakistani cricket team arrive in Zimbabwe for their 2015-2016 tour.

Deaths
13 March - Paddington Mhondoro, 28, cricketer (traffic collision)
9 June - Amos Midzi, 62, politician and diplomat

References

 
2010s in Zimbabwe
Zimbabwe
Zimbabwe
Years of the 21st century in Zimbabwe